Cao Jianyou (July 19, 1917 – September 19, 1997) was a Chinese electrical engineer. He was one of the earliest contributors to Chinese railway electrification, a member of Chinese Academy of Sciences, and an expert in electric power system.

Biography 
Cao Jianyou was born on July 19, 1917, in Changsha, Hunan, Republic of China. He was admitted to the Department of Electrical Engineering of Shanghai Jiaotong University in 1936. After graduation in 1940, he joined the School of Engineering of Southwest Associated University as a faculty member. In 1945 he went to the U.S. to further his study, and got his Ph.D. degree from Massachusetts Institute of Technology in 1950 with his graduation paper Betatron characteristics of the MIT Synchrotron. He joined City College of New York after graduation, as a guest lecturer. After returning to China in 1951, he joined Department of Electrical Engineering of Tangshan Institute of Technology (now Southwest Jiaotong University), where he became the dean of department later. In 1978, he was appointed as Vice Chancellor of Southwest Jiaotong University.  In 1980, he was elected to be a member of Chinese Academy of Sciences.

References

1917 births
1997 deaths
Chinese electrical engineers
Engineers from Hunan
Massachusetts Institute of Technology alumni
Members of the Chinese Academy of Sciences
Academic staff of the National Southwestern Associated University
People from Changsha
Scientists from Hunan
National Chiao Tung University (Shanghai) alumni
Academic staff of the Southwest Jiaotong University
Chinese expatriates in the United States
People of the Republic of China